Volgren is an Australian bus and coach body manufacturer.

History
Volgren was formed in 1977 by Melbourne bus operator Grenda Corporation in Dandenong, Victoria. Because Grenda held the Volvo Buses dealership in Victoria, only chassis from this manufacturer were bodied until 1989 when the dealership was relinquished.

The name is a portmanteau of the two original investors, Volvo and Grenda.

In 1981 a plant was established in Acacia Ridge, Queensland by Grenda Corporation, Hornibrook Bus Lines's Geoff Mountjoy, Greyhound Northern and Stateliner. It bodied some Volvo B59 and B10Rs for Hornibrook Bus Lines and Surfside Buslines before concentrating on Twin and Double Deck Volvo B10M coaches. This closed in the late 1980s.

In December 2011, Brazilian bus manufacturer Marcopolo acquired a 75% shareholding. In April 2014 this was increased to 100%.

Manufacturing facilities
Current factories:
Dandenong, Victoria (VG) completed Volgren's first bus in October 1979
Malaga, Western Australia (VP) opened in April 1999 to fulfill a contract to body Mercedes-Benz O405NHs for Transperth
Eagle Farm, Queensland (VQ) opened in February 2010 
Former factories:
Tomago, New South Wales (VT) opened in March 2010, closed July 2012

Asian operators
Volgren have bodied a number of buses for Asian operators: 
Hong Kong
Kowloon Motor Bus formerly operated 1 Volvo B9TL, 17 MAN 24.310 HOCLNR-NLs and 21 Volvo Super Olympians.
Citybus formerly operated 1 MAN 24.350 HOCLNR-NL and 1 Scania K94UB
Singapore
 SBS Transit formerly operated 50 Volvo Super Olympians, a diesel powered Volvo B10BLE, a Scania L94UB, a Volvo Super Olympian prototype, a Mercedes-Benz O405G prototype, a Volvo B5RLEH and 12 CNG-powered Volvo B10BLEs.
SMRT Buses formerly operated 15 Mercedes-Benz O405s, 11 Hino HS3KRKKs and a HS3KRKA, 2 Dennis Lances and 21 Mercedes-Benz O405Gs.
Malaysia, a substantial number of buses were fitted with the Volgren bodywork as well. Examples can be found in the capital Kuala Lumpur, Shah Alam and Johor Bahru, state capital of Johor.
Japan
Nishi-Nippon Railroad bus, Toei Bus, Niigata Kotsu and Nara Kotsu currently operates Scania K360UA6×2/2LB with Optimus body. The body of these buses is 5 centimeters narrower than normal ones.

Gallery

References

External links

Bus Australia gallery

Bus manufacturers of Australia
Vehicle manufacturing companies established in 1977
Australian companies established in 1977
Dandenong, Victoria
Manufacturing companies based in Melbourne